Euryentmema cigclis is an extinct species of sea snails, a marine gastropod mollusc in the family Mangeliidae.

Description
The length of the shell attains 9.3 mm, its diameter 3.9 mm.

Distribution
This extinct marine species was found in Pliocene strata in the Bowden Formation, Jamaica; age range: 3.6 to 2.588 Ma

References

External links
 Fossilworks : † Euryentmema cigclis

cigclis
Extinct gastropods